Azzurre is the nickname for women's national sport teams in Italy:

Italy women's national basketball team
Italy women's national beach handball team
Italy women's national football team
Italy women's national volleyball team

See also
Azzurri (disambiguation)
Azzurro (disambiguation)